The men's team sprint race of the 2015–16 ISU Speed Skating World Cup 2, arranged in the Utah Olympic Oval, in Salt Lake City, United States, was held on November 22, 2015.

The Canadian team won the race on a new world record, which was held by the Dutch team, and only established the previous weekend. The Russian team came second, and the Dutch team came third.

Results
The race took place on Sunday, November 22, in the afternoon session, scheduled at 15:47.

Note: WR = world record, NR = national record.

References

Men team sprint
2